Phyllonorycter clerotoma is a moth of the family Gracillariidae. It is known from Ecuador.

References

clerotoma
Moths of South America
Moths described in 1915